Franklin Township Public Schools may refer to:

 Franklin Township Public Schools (Somerset County, New Jersey)
 Franklin Township Public Schools (Gloucester County, New Jersey)